Second Army was most recently located at Fort Belvoir, Virginia as a Direct Reporting Unit to Headquarters U.S. Army, Chief Information Officer (CIO)/G-6.  Under the CIO/G-6, Second Army served as the single point of contact for Army missions and functions related to reporting on, assessing, planning, coordinating, integrating, synchronizing, directing and conducting Army network operations.  This mission ended after a 2017 reorganization, when the Second Army was inactivated.

History
Second Army, American Expeditionary Forces (AEF), was established in October 1918 during World War I and demobilized in April 1919. A new Second Army operated from 1933 to 1966, and 1983 to 1995, as a training army in the continental United States.

On 1 October 2010, U.S. Army Cyber Command (ARCYBER) was formed as the Army service component command supporting U.S. Cyber Command, commanded by Lt. Gen. Rhett A. Hernandez. On 6 March 2014, Army headquarters activated Second Army as a direct reporting unit of Army CIO/G-6 with Commander, ARCYBER, dual-hatted as the Second Army Commander.

World War I
The history of the Second Army began as a fighting army on the battlefields of France in the waning days of World War I. Eager to maintain a hard-fought momentum to drive the Germans out of France, on 10 October 1918, General John J. "Black Jack" Pershing, Commander of the American Expeditionary Forces (AEF), selected Lieutenant General Robert L. Bullard to command the newly activated Second Army, AEF. Bullard, a Spanish–American War veteran, earned Pershing's confidence and reputation as an aggressive commander, after leading the 1st Infantry Division during the battle of Cantigny. At Cantigny, Bullard delivered the first American victory of the war. Bullard's orders for Second Army were to hold the line on a portion of the St. Mihiel sector along the Lorraine front. In November, General Pershing ordered Second Army to advance toward Metz. Bullard subsequently launched rigorous attacks against the Germans on 10 November. The 7th, 28th, 33rd, and 92nd divisions, then on the Second Army front, began the attacks.  Encountering stubborn resistance, Second Army made a considerable advance, recovering a total of approximately 25 square miles of French territory before the armistice terminated hostilities on 11 November. During its first month of combat operations, 102 soldiers serving under Second Army earned the Distinguished Service Cross. After the armistice, Second Army occupied an area in Belgium and Luxembourg, remaining there until the end of March 1919, and demobilized in France on 15 April 1919.

World War II
Second Army earned distinction as a training army during World War II, preparing nearly one million men to fight. The U.S. Army activated a new Second Army in October 1933, with headquarters at Chicago, Illinois, as one of four field armies that would help mobilize forces in the event of a national emergency. In December 1940, the Army moved Second Army's headquarters to Memphis, Tennessee, and designated it as a training army, which conducted training in 24 states. In June 1944, the Army reconstituted the World War I Second Army, AEF, and consolidated it with the existing Second Army in order to perpetuate the lineage and honors of the World War I unit. During World War II, Second Army trained 11 corps, 55 divisions, and 2,000 smaller units of all arms and services, totaling almost a million men, for employment in all theaters of operation.

Post-World War II
Second Army continued its training role after the war. In June 1946, Second Army moved its headquarters to Baltimore, Maryland, as one of six Continental Armies under the Army Ground Forces. Second Army encompassed the seven states of Delaware, Kentucky, Maryland, Ohio, Pennsylvania, Virginia, and West Virginia, and the District of Columbia. In June 1947, Second Army Headquarters moved to Fort George G. Meade, Maryland. On 1 January 1957, the Army redesignated Second Army as Second United States Army, as one of the six Zone of Interior Armies of the United States. Second U.S. Army supported multi-purpose missions of command, operations, training and provisions of administrative and logistical services to ensure the continued operational readiness of its assigned combat and support units in the active Army, Army Reserves and National Guard.

At the height of the Cold War, Second U.S. Army helped mobilize forces for potential conflict. During the Berlin Crisis of 1961, Second U.S. Army mobilized 39 National Guard and Army Reserve units in the seven state area and eight Army Reserve units from other Army areas. During the Cuban Missile Crisis, Second U.S. Army deployed 41 units, which comprised more than 5,700 military personnel.

Reorganizations within the U.S. Army led to Second U.S. Army being inactivated twice from 1966 to 1995. On 1 January 1966, First and Second U.S. Armies merged, resulting in the inactivation of Second U.S. Army. In July 1983, Second U.S. Army reactivated at Fort Gillem, Georgia, and assumed responsibility for Reserve Component matters in seven states and two territories formerly belonging to First Army. In July 1995, First Army left Fort Meade, Maryland, and reorganized at Fort Gillem, upon the inactivation of Second U.S. Army.

Army Cyber Command
The establishment of U.S. Army Cyber Command in 2010 earmarked the Army's entry into the new operational domain of cyberspace and perpetuated the lineage and honors of Second Army. The 1 October 2010, Headquarters Department of the Army (HQDA) General Orders No. 2010–26, which established Army Cyber Command, stated that it would "perpetuate the lineage and honors of the Second Army as specified by the United States Army Center of Military History." The Army Center of Military History agreed to use the naming convention established for geographic Army Service Component Commands, which would not have numbered Army designations; that is, the designation would be U.S. Army Cyber Command and not "Second Army"; only the lineage and honors of Second Army would be assigned to Army Cyber Command. General Orders No. 2010–26 redesignated the inactive Headquarters and Headquarters Company, Second U. S. Army, as U.S. Army Cyber Command, with its headquarters at Fort Belvoir, Virginia.

On 6 March 2014, HQDA General Orders No. 2014-02, activated a new unit designated Second Army as a Direct Reporting Unit of the Army Chief Information Officer/G-6, HQDA, with the Commander, U.S. Army Cyber Command as the Commander, Second Army. The General Orders also resulted in the Second Army lineage and honors being withdrawn from Army Cyber Command and assigned to the new unit. The U.S. Army Network Enterprise Technology Command (NETCOM), formerly a Direct Reporting Unit of the Chief Information Officer/G-6, HQDA, which supported Army Cyber Command's mission, was assigned to Second Army in accordance with Title 10, United States Code, Section 162 (a) (2) to carry out the functions assigned to the Secretary of the Army in Titles 10, 40 and 44 United States Code. The resulting command and control arrangement, designating the Commander, U.S. Army Cyber Command, also as the Commander, Second Army, optimized the Army's force structure to better support Army Cyber Command's mission. The commander of NETCOM is dual-hatted as deputy commanding general (DCG), Second Army.

Second Army served as the single point of contact for Army missions and functions related to reporting on, assessing, planning, coordinating, integrating, synchronizing, directing and conducting Army network operations.

A 2017 reorganization eliminated the need for Second Army's network operations coordinating function, and the unit was inactivated on 31 March 2017. ARCYBER now continues the lineage and honors associated with Second Army, now that Network Enterprise Technology Command (NETCOM) is part of ARCYBER.

Organization 
Organization of the Army just before deactivation was as follows:

 United States Army Network Enterprise Technology Command (NETCOM)
 1st Information Operations Command (Land)
 Cyber Protection Brigade
 780th Military Intelligence Brigade

Past Commanders

References

External links
 Second US Army Official Website
 The Doughboy Center: Second Army

002 Army
Military units and formations established in 1918
Military units and formations disestablished in 2017
1918 establishments in the United States
2017 disestablishments in Virginia
Defunct organizations based in Virginia
Organizations based in Fairfax County, Virginia